Portrait of Fra Teodoro of Urbino as Saint Dominic is an oil painting on canvas by Giovanni Bellini, dating to 1515. His final portrait, it is in the collection of the Victoria and Albert Museum in London, from which it is on long-term loan to the National Gallery in the same city. It depicts an old prelate with the attributes of Saint Dominic, including an austere black cap and a white lily.

References

Bibliography

 

Teodoro
Teodoro
Paintings in the collection of the Victoria and Albert Museum